The year 624 BC was a year of the pre-Julian Roman calendar. In the Roman Empire, it was known as year 130 Ab urbe condita . The denomination 624 BC for this year has been used since the early medieval period, when the Anno Domini calendar era became the prevalent method in Europe for naming years.

Events

Births
 Thales, Greek scientist and philosopher (approximate date) (d. c. 546 BC)

Deaths

References